Daniel Pierre Langrand (7 October 1921 – 15 December 1998) was a French footballer and coach.

He was born in Tourcoing (Nord) in October 1921. Langrand was goalkeeper for Olympique avignonnais, after World War II, and later became a coach.

He began his career in Belgium with SC Boussu-Bois before joining AA La Louvière. In 1954, he joined AS Aulnoye-Aymeries. He spent ten years at the avesnois club, before continuing his professional adventure at Daring Club de Bruxelles, in 1964.

Between April 1966 and 1969, he trained Lille OSC. After that, he managed the players of USG Boulogne until 1979.

References 

1921 births
1998 deaths
Association football goalkeepers
AC Avignonnais players
French football managers
French footballers
Lille OSC managers
Sportspeople from Tourcoing
US Boulogne managers
Footballers from Hauts-de-France
Expatriate football managers in Belgium
French expatriate sportspeople in Belgium
R.A.A. Louviéroise managers
R.W.D. Molenbeek managers